Edward J. "Jellyroll" Hogan Jr. (October 15, 1885 – August 11, 1963) was an American Democratic politician who served in the Missouri General Assembly.  He served in the Missouri Senate between 1945 and 1957 after serving in the Missouri House of Representatives.

Born in St. Louis, Missouri, he was educated in the public and parochial schools of St. Louis.  On February 15, 1905, Hogan married Jennie Durr of St. Louis who died on June 21, 1931, as the mother of five children.  Hogan was active in Democratic Party politics for about half a century.

References

External links
 The Political Graveyard: Index to Politicians, Hogan
 Edward J. "Jellyroll" Hogan Jr., Find a Grave

1885 births
1963 deaths
20th-century American politicians
Democratic Party Missouri state senators
Politicians from St. Louis